Jan Anna Gumaar Ceulemans (born 28 February 1957) is a Belgian former professional footballer who played as an attacking midfielder. A prolific goalscorer, Ceulemans was known for his stamina, aerial ability and technique. He was also known for his power, imposing frame and natural authority.

Ceulemans was also a regular member of the Belgium national football team, with 96 international appearances, a record that stood for 16 years until it was surpassed by Jan Vertonghen's 97th appearance for Belgium on 10 October 2017; Ceulemans is now the ninth most-capped for Belgium. Most of his time with Belgium took place under the guidance of Guy Thys. This period saw the Belgium squad record some of their finest results, which include reaching the final of Euro 80 and fourth place at the 1986 FIFA World Cup.

Career
Ceulemans was born in Lier, Belgium. His first of three World Cup appearances was at the 1982 FIFA World Cup, where Belgium beat the defending champions Argentina 1–0 in the opening game of the tournament at Camp Nou en route to reaching the second round. Among Ceulemans' finest achievements was captaining his national side to fourth place in the 1986 FIFA World Cup, scoring three goals in the tournament including a spectacular diving header against Spain in the quarter-finals. His performance earned the nickname "Captain Courageous". He retired from international competition after the 1990 FIFA World Cup; Jan scored the third goal in a 3–1 win over Uruguay but Belgium was eliminated by England in the round of sixteen, with the winning goal being scored by David Platt in the 119th minute in extra time. Jan had struck the post during the game.

Professionally, he stayed at Club Brugge for 13 years, endearing himself to his country when he turned down an offer from Italian club A.C. Milan. He remains the only football player to have posed with the A.C. Milan board for the press that never actually became an A.C. Milan player.

After retiring as a player due to knee injury, he became a manager at KSC Eendracht Aalst in 1992. He won promotion to Belgian First Division and even a qualification for UEFA Cup. He moved in 1998 to K.V.C. Westerlo where he also qualified for UEFA Cup. In 2005, he is back at 'his' Club Brugge where he would be manager for three years but after several bad results he was fired in April 2006. For the 2007–08 season, he returned to K.V.C. Westerlo. He currently lives in Westerlo.

He was named by Pelé as one of the top 125 greatest living footballers in March 2004.

Career statistics

Honours

Player 
Club Brugge
 Belgian First Division: 1979–80, 1987–88, 1989–90
 Belgian Cup: 1985–86, 1990–91; runners-up: 1978–79, 1982–83
 Belgian Super Cup: 1980, 1986, 1988, 1990, 1991
 Jules Pappaert Cup: 1978, 1991
 Bruges Matins: 1979, 1981, 1984, 1990
 Japan Cup Kirin World Soccer: 1981
 Amsterdam Tournament: 1990

Belgium
 UEFA European Championship: runners-up 1980
 FIFA World Cup: 1986 (fourth place)
 Belgian Sports Merit Award: 1980

Manager 
Eendracht Aalst
 Belgian Second Division play-off winner: 1993–94

KVC Westerlo
 Belgian Cup: 2000–01

Club Brugge
 Belgian Super Cup: 2005

Individual
 Belgian First Division Man of the Season: 1979–80, 1982–83, 1985–86
 Belgian Golden Shoe: 1980, 1985, 1986
 UEFA European Championship Team of the Tournament: 1980
 Ballon d'Or 5th place: 1980
 Ballon d'Or nominations: 1981, 1985, 1986
 Onze de Bronze: 1981
 Belgian Professional Footballer of the Year: 1984, 1985, 1986
 FIFA World Cup All-Star Team: 1986
 Belgian Fair Play Award: 1986
 Former Belgium's Most Capped Player: 1989–2017 (96 caps)
 World Soccer Magazine World XI: 1990
 Belgian Sports Merit Award: 1990
 Belgian Golden Shoe of the 20th Century (2nd place): 1995
Platina 11 (Best Team in 50 Years Golden Shoe Winners): 2003
FIFA 100: 2004
 The Best Golden Shoe Team Ever: 2011
 Het Nieuwsblad Best Club Brugge player ever: 2011
 Honorary Citizen of Lier: 2014
 These Football Times Top 50 Legends: 2017
 RBFA 125 Years Icons Team: 2020

References

External links
 Jan Ceulemans on All Red Devils (RBFA)
 
 

1957 births
Living people
People from Lier, Belgium
Association football forwards
Belgian footballers
Belgium international footballers
Belgian Pro League players
Lierse S.K. players
Club Brugge KV players
Belgian football managers
S.C. Eendracht Aalst managers
K.V.C. Westerlo managers
K.M.S.K. Deinze managers
Club Brugge KV head coaches
FIFA 100
UEFA Euro 1980 players
UEFA Euro 1984 players
1982 FIFA World Cup players
1986 FIFA World Cup players
1990 FIFA World Cup players
Footballers from Antwerp Province